{{DISPLAYTITLE:C11H10O4}}
The molecular formula C11H10O4 may refer to:

 Citropten
 Eugenin
 Polytrimethylene terephthalate (repeating unit)
 Scoparone